San Juan, Puerto Rico, held an election for mayor on November 3, 2020. Among other elections, it was held concurrently with the 2020 Puerto Rico gubernatorial election. It saw the election of New Progressive Party nominee Miguel Romero.

Incumbent mayor Carmen Yulín Cruz, a member of the Popular Democratic Party did not seek reelection to a third term, and instead ran an unsuccessful campaign for her party's nomination in the gubernatorial election.

Nominations

Citizen's Victory Movement
Citizen's Victory Movement nominated Manuel Natal Albelo, an at-large member of the Puerto Rico House of Representatives.

New Progressive Party primary
The New Progressive Party held their party's primary election on August 9, nominating Miguel Romero (a district member of the Senate of Puerto Rico) over Manuel Colón.

Popular Democratic Party
The Popular Democracy Party cancelled its party primary election. It nominated Rossana López León, an at-large member of the Senate of Puerto Rico, without holding a primary.

Project Dignity
Project Dignity nominated Nelson Rosario Rodríguez.

Puerto Rican Independence Party
The Puerto Rican Independence Party nominated Adrián González Costa.

General

Polls

Results

Litigation
Manuel Natal Albelo launched a legal challenge demanding that a new election be held for the municipality's 77th Unit, which groups together several forms of absentee-voting and mail-in ballots. In his litigation, he alleged widespread irregularities during the counting process and leading to the election. The lawsuit was dismissed by a judge in January 2021.

See also
2020 Puerto Rican general election

References

2020
San Juan, Puerto Rico mayoral
San Juan, Puerto Rico